Henryk Hlebowicz (1904 – November 9, 1941) was a Polish Roman Catholic priest. He was born in Grodno. He served on the faculty of Vilnius University. He was shot at Borisov in Belarus. He is one of the 108 Martyrs of World War II who were beatified in 1999 by Pope John Paul II.

See also 
The Holocaust in Poland
World War II casualties of Poland

References

1904 births
1941 deaths
People from Grodno
People from Grodnensky Uyezd
20th-century Polish Roman Catholic priests
Academic staff of Vilnius University
Polish people executed by Nazi Germany